Mistral gagnant is a studio album from French artist Renaud on the Virgin France label, now part of EMI, released in 1985.

The first song, "Miss Maggie", made Renaud a controversial character in the United Kingdom because the song praises women for their non-violence and honesty with the exception of PM Margaret Thatcher (a version of the song with the lyrics adapted in English was also recorded). The last verses read (translated from French): "In the final hour, [...] if I can stay on earth, I would like to become a dog and have Margaret Thatcher as a lamp post to urinate against, daily." It was composed with Jean-Pierre Bucolo, who also helped with "La pêche à la ligne" and "Si t'es mon pote", while Franck Langolff co-wrote the music for "Morts les enfants" and "Fatigué".

In the title song "Mistral gagnant", Renaud sings to his young daughter about his childhood and realizes that time flies as will fly away the laughs of his daughter as a child. This broad theme plus the very simple music make this song one of the classics among Renaud's "tender" songs. A mistral gagnant was a kind of candy and lottery. Some of them were "winning" (gagnant) and you could get another one for free. These candies were not on sale anymore when he wrote the song.

Track listing
 "Miss Maggie".
 "La pêche à la ligne" [Going fishing]
 "Si t'es mon pote" [If you're my mate]
 "Mistral gagnant"
 "Trois matelots" [Three sailors]
 "Tu vas au bal?" [Are you going dancing?]
 "Morts les enfants" [Dead the children]
 "Baby-sitting blues"
 "P'tite conne" [Silly fool]
 "Le retour de la Pépette"
 "Fatigué" [Fed up]

Tracks 1, 2, 4, 6, 7 and 11 are all used on the live album Visage pâle rencontrer public. Tracks 1, 2, 4, 7 and 11 were included on the 2007 compilation The Meilleur of Renaud. Tracks 1, 2, 4, 7 and 9 were covered for the tribute album La Bande à Renaud.

Personnel
Renaud - vocals, backing vocals
Jean-Philippe Goude, Randy Kerber - keyboards
Neil Stubenhaus - bass
Mick "Pooh" Baird - drums
Judith Chilnick, Paulinho Da Costa - percussion
Jean-Louis Roques - accordion
Ernie Watts, Larry Klimas - saxophone
John Johnson - tuba
Georges Costa, Jean-Jacques Cramier, Klaus Blasquiz, Michel Adjaj, Michel Costa - backing vocals
Donn Wilkerson - string conductor

References

1985 albums
Renaud albums
Virgin Records albums